Mount Caldwell is a peak of the Walker Mountains, located  southeast of Mount Lopez, near the western end of Thurston Island, Antarctica. It was delineated from air photos taken by U.S. Navy Operation Highjump in December 1946 and named by the Advisory Committee on Antarctic Names for Captain Henry Howard Caldwell, U.S. Navy, captain of the seaplane tender Pine Island which explored the area during this expedition. Caldwell and six others survived a December 30, 1946 crash of a seaplane at Thurston Island.

See also
 Mountains in Antarctica

Maps
 Thurston Island – Jones Mountains. 1:500000 Antarctica Sketch Map. US Geological Survey, 1967.
 Antarctic Digital Database (ADD). Scale 1:250000 topographic map of Antarctica. Scientific Committee on Antarctic Research (SCAR). Since 1993, regularly upgraded and updated.

References 

Mountains of Ellsworth Land